is a railway station on the Iida Line in the village of Tenryū, Shimoina, Nagano Prefecture, Japan, operated by Central Japan Railway Company (JR Central).

Lines
Hiraoka Station is served by the Iida Line and is 93.8 kilometers from the starting point of the line at Toyohashi Station.

Station layout
The station consists of a single ground-level island platform connected to the station building by a level crossing. The station is staffed.

Platforms

Adjacent stations

History
It was renamed to its present name on 15 November 1952. With the privatization of Japanese National Railways (JNR) on 1 April 1987, the station came under the control of JR Central.

Passenger statistics
In fiscal 2016, the station was used by an average of 64 passengers daily (boarding passengers only).

Surrounding area
 Tenryū Village Hall
 Tenryū Elementary School
 Tenryū Junior High School

See also
 List of railway stations in Japan

References

External links

 Hiraoka Station information 

Railway stations in Nagano Prefecture
Railway stations in Japan opened in 1936
Stations of Central Japan Railway Company
Iida Line
Tenryū, Nagano